The House of Doksim and Efto Čadlovski is a historical house in Galičnik that is listed as Cultural heritage of North Macedonia. It is in ownership of one branch of the family of Čadlovski.

Family history

Notable members of the family 
 Gligur Čadlovski - member of the Communist Party of Yugoslavia
 Metodija Čadlovski - member of the League of Communist Youth of Yugoslavia.

References

External links
 National Register of objects that are cultural heritage (List updated to December 31, 2012) (In Macedonian)
 Office for Protection of Cultural Heritage (In Macedonian)

Galičnik
Cultural heritage of North Macedonia
Historic houses